Wayne Hankin is an American musician, conductor and composer. He is known for his performance in early music, theater and creation of musical compositions for unusual instruments.

Early life
Hankin was born in  Baltimore, Maryland. His father, Sheldon James Hankin was a salesman and his mother Bette Jane Hankin who was a mezzo-soprano with the Baltimore Opera Company where she apprenticed under Rosa Ponselle. Hankin received secondary education from The Park School, obtained his bachelor's degree in Music History at the Hartt College of Music and master's degree in Early Music Performance Practice at the New England Conservatory. His principle teachers were Jack Ramey, Shelley Gruskin, Daniel Pinkham, Nancy Joyce, David Hart, Michael Schneider and Mattius Maute.

Career
In 1980 Hankin made his way to Europe settling in West Berlin performing in concert halls, radio, television and theater. He performed with several early music ensembles and collaborated with several instrument makers commissioning obscure instruments such as string drum (used alongside the tabor pipe) and chromatic jaw's harps. Over the next 20 years, he expanded his instrument collection to over 400 items composing music specifically for them.  It was in Berlin he first worked with Meredith Monk at the Schabühne am Lehliner Platz (Dir. Peter Stein) and became her music director over a 15-year period.

During 1986 he resettled in New York performing with artists Arif Mardin and Julie Taymor, and a soloist with numerous period ensembles most notably Early Music New York and Piffarro.  In 1991 Hankin made his conducting debut with the Houston Grand Opera performing Ms. Monk's Atlas and continued to conduct in Europe and America. Throughout the 1990s he directed music at several regional theaters such as Long Wharf Theater, Center Stage, and the Alley Theater. In 2001 Hankin joined Cirque du Soleil and toured over a four-year period, after which he continued to work for the organization in other departments as well as continued work in film and television.

Hankin has written more than 300 pieces of music. His best-known compositions included "Salmon Springtime", composed for 18 chromatic trumps (Jews harps) and "The Spirit Shall Return" for two sopranos and chamber ensemble. Other works utilized lesser known instruments including shawms, dulcians, crumhorns, rauspfieffes, renaissance flutes, recorders, gemshorns, western bagpipes and other period instruments.

The Striking Voice
Displaying talent on a wide variety of instruments he had a particular lasting influence as a Jews' harp and bagpipe player. He has also worked on non-musical alternatives beyond the field of music. In 2008, he was given a pilot program at Johns Hopkins Medical Center under the direction of Dr. Joseph Califano and speech therapist Kim Webster to work with mostly throat cancer patients and eventually developed the Striking Voice, a method recreating speech by way of a musical instrument (trump). It is the lowest cost method of speech replication known.

Filmography

External links
 http://www.waynehankin.com
 

Musicians from Baltimore
Living people
American male musicians
Year of birth missing (living people)